The Council of Ashtishat called by Saint Narses catholicos of the Armenian church in 354 AD, was the first ever council of bishops in Armenia. It was held in Ashtishat, the location of mother church of Armenia.

The council saw the drafting of canons and rules for church administration and was part of the process of establishing the Armenian canon of the Bible. It also set standards for moral aspects of public life and laws to protect the family.

References 

6th-century church councils
364
Ancient Armenia
Armenian Apostolic Church
4th century in Armenia
Christianity in the Sasanian Empire
Sasanian Armenia
Governing assemblies of religious organizations